The 2008–09 season was the 98th season in Hajduk Split's history and their eighteenth in the Prva HNL. Their 5th-place finish in the 2007–08 season meant it was their 18th successive season playing in the Prva HNL.

First-team squad 
Squad at end of season

Competitions

Overall record

Prva HNL

Classification

Results summary

Results by round

Results by opponent

Source: 2008–09 Croatian First Football League article

Matches

Prva HNL

Source: HRnogomet.com

Croatian Football Cup

Source: HRnogomet.com

UEFA Cup

First qualifying round

Second qualifying round 

Source: uefa.com

Player seasonal records
Competitive matches only. Updated to games played 31 May 2009.

Top scorers

Source: Competitive matches

See also
2008–09 Croatian First Football League
2008–09 Croatian Football Cup

References

External links
 2008–09 Prva HNL at HRnogomet.com
 2008–09 Croatian Cup at HRnogomet.com
 2008–09 UEFA Cup at rsssf.com

Hajduk Split
HNK Hajduk Split seasons